The Cubi series is a group of stainless steel sculptures built from cubes, rectangular solids and cylinders with spheroidal or flat endcaps. These pieces are among the last works completed by the sculptor David Smith. The artist died in a car accident on May 23, 1965, soon after the completion of Cubi XXVIII, which may or may not have been the last sculpture he intended to create in this series. The Cubis are among Smith's final experiments in his progression toward a more simplified, abstract form of expression. As an example of Modernism, these are representative of the monumental works in industrial materials that characterized much of the sculpture from this period.  

Although the Cubis are abstract works composed of geometric shapes, they are ambiguously figural. For example, the pictured Cubi VI appears to be standing on a pair of crossed legs. Like many of the Abstract Expressionists, Smith possessed the ability to easily switch between an abstract and figurative style of working. His process also involved going back and forth between the different stages of development within a certain style or serial group, as suggested by the Cubis. These sculptures were not completed in the order in which they are numbered, as revealed by the inscriptions (see below) that Smith welded onto the base of each.

Today, the majority of the Cubi works are part of well-known museum collections around the world, including the Museum of Modern Art in New York, the Tate Modern in London and the Art Institute of Chicago. In 2005, Cubi XXVIII was sold at Sotheby's for $23.8 million, breaking a record for the most expensive piece of contemporary art ever sold at auction. "This exceedingly rare work was the pinnacle of a four-decade career," said Tobias Meyer, Sotheby's worldwide head of contemporary art and the auctioneer for the evening.

 Cubi I  March 4, 1963 
 Cubi II  October 25, 1962
 Cubi III  November 10, 1961 
 Cubi IV January 17, 1963
 Cubi V January 16, 1963
 Cubi VI March 21, 1963
 Cubi VII March 28, 1963
 Cubi VIII December 24, 1962
 Cubi IX October 26, 1961
 Cubi X April 4,1963
 Cubi XI March 30, 1963
 Cubi XII April 7, 1963
 Cubi XIII March 25, 1963
 Cubi XIV September 25, 1963
 Cubi XV September 27, 1963
 Cubi XVI November 4, 1963
 Cubi XVII December 4, 1963
 Cubi XVIII February 14, 1964
 Cubi XIX February 20, 1964
 Cubi XX February 20, 1964
 Cubi XXI April 4, 1964
 Cubi XXII June 5, 1964
 Cubi XXIII November 30, 1964
 Cubi XXIV December 8, 1964
 Cubi XXV January 9, 1965
 Cubi XXVI January 12, 1965
 Cubi XXVII March 5, 1965
 Cubi XXVIII May 5, 1965

References

Carmean, E. A.  David Smith.  Washington: National Gallery of Art, 1982.
Hamill, Sarah.  David Smith: Works, Writings, Interview.  Barcelona: Ediciones Poliígrafa, 2011.
Kramer, Hilton.  “A Critic Calls David Smith ‘Greatest of All American Artists.’”  New York Times Magazine, February 16, 1969, 40-62.
Krauss, Rosalind E.  Terminal Iron Works: The Sculpture of David Smith.  Cambridge, MA:  MIT Press, 1971.

External links 

 Cubi I at the Detroit Institute of Arts
 Cubi II, in a private collection
 Cubi III at the Museum of Contemporary Art, Los Angeles
 Cubi IV at the Milwaukee Art Museum in Milwaukee, Wisconsin
 Cubi V owned by the Jon and Mary Shirley Foundation
 Cubi VI at the Israel Museum in Jerusalem, Israel
 Cubi VII at the Art Institute of Chicago, Chicago, Illinois
 Cubi VIII at the Meadows Museum at Southern Methodist University, Dallas, Texas
 Cubi IX at the Walker Art Center in Minneapolis, Minnesota
 Cubi X at the Museum of Modern Art in New York, New York
 Cubi XI owned by the Morris and Gwendolyn Cafritz Foundation, on display at the National Gallery of Art in Washington, D.C.
 Cubi XII at the Hirshhorn Museum in Washington, D.C.
 Cubi XIII at the Princeton University Art Museum, in Princeton, New Jersey
 Cubi XIV at the Saint Louis Art Museum in St. Louis, Missouri
 Cubi XV at the San Diego Museum of Art in San Diego, California
 Cubi XVI at the Albright-Knox Art Gallery, Buffalo, New York
 Cubi XVII at the Dallas Museum of Art
 Cubi XVIII at the Museum of Fine Arts, Boston
 Cubi XIX at the Tate Gallery
 Cubi XX at the Franklin D. Murphy Sculpture Garden
 Cubi XXI at the Storm King Art Center owned by the Lipman Family Foundation
 Cubi XXII at the Yale University Art Gallery
 Cubi XXIII at the Los Angeles County Museum
 Cubi XXIV at the Carnegie Museum of Art, Pittsburgh, Pennsylvania
 Cubi XXV owned by Jane Lang Davis
 Cubi XXVI at the National Gallery of Art in Washington, D.C.
 Cubi XXVII at the Solomon R. Guggenheim Museum
 Cubi XXVIII purchased at auction in 2005 by Eli Broad

1963 sculptures
1964 sculptures
1965 sculptures
Abstract sculpture
Cubic sculpture
Modernist sculpture
Sculpture series
Sculptures by David Smith
Steel sculptures